Memorial sign "Tulumbas" is a memorial to nature and history created for the National Historical and Cultural Preserve "Chyhyryn", located in the Kholodnyi Yar reserve. A large round copper cooking vessel was fixed to a big oak tree at this historical place long ago. A strong ringing was heard at a long distance when somebody would hit against the vessel with a stick.
The sound convened local Cossacks for a meeting. Recently a drum (tulumtas) made of granite was established here as a monument to local avengers and their leader Maksym Zaliznyak.

References

External links 
 NHCP "Chyhyryn" site
 Memorial sign Tulumbas, Melnyky
 2009, Memorial sign "Tulumbas"
 NHCP "Chyhyryn" guide

National Historical and Cultural Preserve "Chyhyryn"